Gajda may refer to:

 Gaida or gajda, a bagpipe from southeastern Europe
 Bogdan Gajda, Polish boxer
 Norbert Gajda, Polish footballer
 Radola Gajda, Czech general and fascist leader